Clarence Francis "Heinie" Mueller (September 16, 1899 – January 23, 1975) was an American center and right fielder in Major League Baseball. Born in Creve Coeur, Missouri, Mueller debuted September 25, and played his final game on June 15, . He played for the St. Louis Cardinals (1920–1926), New York Giants (1926–1927), Boston Braves (1928–1929), and St. Louis Browns (1935). In 11 seasons, Mueller played in 693 games (367 as a center fielder) and had a batting average of .282 (597-for-2118) with 22 home runs and 272 RBI. He died in DeSoto, Missouri, at age 75.

"Heinie" was a popular nickname for German baseball players in the early part of the 20th century. Mueller was one of 22 major league Heinies in the first half of the century. Others include: Heinie Beckendorf 1909–1910, Heinie Berger 1907–1910, Heinie Elder 1913–1913, Heinie Groh 1912–1927 – of "bottle bat" fame, Heinie Heitmuller 1909–1910,  Heinie Heltzel 1943–1944, Heinie Jantzen 1912–1912, Heinie Kappel 1887–1889,  Heinie Manush 1923–1939 – the only Hall of Fame "Heinie", Heinie Meine 1922–1934, Heinie Mueller 1938–1941, Heinie Odom 1925–1925, Heinie Peitz 1892–1913, Heinie Reitz 1893–1899, Heinie Sand 1923–1928, Heinie Scheer 1922–1923, Heinie Schuble 1927–1936, Heinie Smith 1897–1903, Heinie Stafford 1916–1916, Heinie Wagner 1902–1918, and Heinie Zimmerman 1907–1919 – implicated in the Black Sox scandal. There have been no Heinies in the major leagues since World War II.

Heinie was the brother of fellow MLB player Walter Mueller.

External links

1899 births
1975 deaths
Major League Baseball center fielders
Baseball players from Missouri
Boston Braves players
Buffalo Bisons (minor league) players
Cedar Rapids Raiders players
Fort Smith Twins players
Greensburg Red Wings players
Houston Buffaloes players
Milwaukee Brewers (minor league) players
Monett Red Birds
Nashville Vols players
New York Giants (NL) players
St. Louis Browns players
St. Louis Cardinals players
Syracuse Chiefs players
Syracuse Stars (minor league baseball) players
Toledo Mud Hens players
Union City Greyhounds players
People from St. Louis County, Missouri